The Minister for Parliamentary Business is a junior ministerial post in the Scottish Government. As a result, the minister does not attend the Scottish Cabinet but supports the Cabinet Secretary for Covid Recovery, who is a member of the cabinet. The minister has the job of steering government business through the Scottish Parliament.

The current minister is George Adam, who was appointed in May 2021.

History 
The post was originally created in May 1999 as Chief Whip and Government Business Manager as a cabinet position in the Labour Liberal Scottish Executive along with the junior Deputy Business Manager, both positions where renamed after a few weeks to the Minister for Parliament and Deputy Minister for Parliament respectively. The posts where renamed again in November 2001 to Minister for Parliamentary Business and Deputy Minister for Parliamentary Business following the election of Jack McConnell as First Minister.

The a cabinet post was downgrade to that of a junior minister reporting to the First Minister following the election of an SNP minority government in May 2007. The post remained a junior one until the May 2011 Scottish Parliament election after which a new cabinet post of Cabinet Secretary for Parliamentary Business and Government Strategy was established with the Minister for Parliamentary Business and Chief Whip reporting to it, this set up remained in place until a government reshuffle in September 2012 saw the cabinet post abolished with responsibility of Government Strategy being given to the Deputy First Minister, and the post of Minister for Parliamentary Business being re-established reporting to both First Minister and Deputy First Minister.

This changed in the reshuffle announced on 21 November 2014, with Joe FitzPatrick reporting directly to Deputy First Minister of Scotland, John Swinney. In the June 2018 reshuffle cabinet level responsibility for parliamentary business was assigned to the Cabinet Secretary for Government Business and Constitutional Relations, who is supported by the Minister for Parliamentary Business and Veterans.

In May 2021, following the Nicola Sturgeon's SNP victory, George Adam was promoted to Minister for Parliamentary Business, with the post losing responsibility of veteran affairs.

List of office holders

Cabinet position

Junior Minister

See also
 Scottish Parliament
 Scottish Government

References

External links 
 Minister for Parliamentary Business - Scottish Government
 Minister for Parliamentary Business - Scottish Parliament

Parliamentary Business
Scottish Parliament
Political whips